The women's time trial class C1-3 road cycling event at the 2020 Summer Paralympics took place on 31 August 2021 at the Fuji Speedway, Japan. 14 riders from 11 nations competed in this event.

The event covers the following three classifications, that all use standard bicycles:
C1: cyclists with severe hemiplegic or diplegic spasticity; severe athetosis or ataxia; bilateral through knee amputation, etcetera.
C2: cyclists with moderate hemiplegic or diplegic spasticity; moderate athetosis or ataxia; unilateral above knee amputation, etcetera.
C3: cyclists with moderate hemiplegic or diplegic spasticity; moderate athetosis or ataxia; bilateral below knee or unilateral through knee amputation, etcetera.

Results
The event took place on 31 August 2021, at 8:55:

Factors
C1 – 92.430
C2 – 96.410
C3 – 100.00

References

Women's road time trial C1-3